The density of air or atmospheric density, denoted ρ, is the mass per unit volume of Earth's atmosphere. Air density, like air pressure, decreases with increasing altitude. It also changes with variation in atmospheric pressure, temperature and humidity.

Air density is a property used in many branches of science, engineering, and industry, including aeronautics; gravimetric analysis; the air-conditioning industry; atmospheric research and meteorology; agricultural engineering (modeling and tracking of Soil-Vegetation-Atmosphere-Transfer (SVAT) models); and the engineering community that deals with compressed air.

Depending on the measuring instruments used, different sets of equations for the calculation of the density of air can be applied.  Air is a mixture of gases and the calculations always simplify, to a greater or lesser extent, the properties of the mixture.

Temperature
Other things being equal, hotter air is less dense than cooler air and will thus rise through cooler air. This can be seen by using the ideal gas law as an approximation.

Dry air

The density of dry air can be calculated using the ideal gas law, expressed as a function of temperature and pressure:

where:

, air density (kg/m3)
, absolute pressure (Pa)
, absolute temperature (K)
 is the gas constant,  in J⋅K−1⋅mol−1 
 is the Boltzmann constant,  in J⋅K−1

Therefore:
 At IUPAC standard temperature and pressure (0°C and 100kPa), dry air has a density of approximately 1.2754kg/m3.
 At 20°C and 101.325kPa, dry air has a density of 1.2041 kg/m3.
 At 70°F and 14.696psi, dry air has a density of 0.074887lb/ft3.

The following table illustrates the air density–temperature relationship at 1 atm or 101.325 kPa:

Humid air

The addition of water vapor to air (making the air humid) reduces the density of the air, which may at first appear counter-intuitive. This occurs because the molar mass of water vapor (18g/mol) is less than the molar mass of dry air (around 29g/mol).  For any ideal gas, at a given temperature and pressure, the number of molecules is constant for a particular volume (see Avogadro's Law).  So when water molecules (water vapor) are added to a given volume of air, the dry air molecules must decrease by the same number, to keep the pressure or temperature from increasing.  Hence the mass per unit volume of the gas (its density) decreases.

The density of humid air may be calculated by treating it as a mixture of ideal gases. In this case, the partial pressure of water vapor is known as the vapor pressure. Using this method, error in the density calculation is less than 0.2% in the range of −10 °C to 50 °C. The density of humid air is found by:
  

where:
, density of the humid air (kg/m3)
, partial pressure of dry air (Pa)
, specific gas constant for dry air, 287.058J/(kg·K)
, temperature (K)
, pressure of water vapor (Pa)
, specific gas constant for water vapor, 461.495J/(kg·K)
, molar mass of dry air, 0.0289652kg/mol
, molar mass of water vapor, 0.018016kg/mol
, universal gas constant, 8.31446J/(K·mol)

The vapor pressure of water may be calculated from the saturation vapor pressure and relative humidity. It is found by:

where:
, vapor pressure of water
, relative humidity (0.0–1.0)
, saturation vapor pressure

The saturation vapor pressure of water at any given temperature is the vapor pressure when relative humidity is 100%. One formula is Tetens' equation from used to find the saturation vapor pressure is:

where:
, saturation vapor pressure (hPa)
, temperature (°C)

See vapor pressure of water for other equations.

The partial pressure of dry air  is found considering partial pressure, resulting in:

Where  simply denotes the observed absolute pressure.

Variation with altitude

Troposphere
To calculate the density of air as a function of altitude, one requires additional parameters. For the troposphere, the lowest part (~10 km) of the atmosphere, they are listed below, along with their values according to the International Standard Atmosphere, using for calculation the universal gas constant instead of the air specific constant:

, sea level standard atmospheric pressure, 101325Pa
, sea level standard temperature, 288.15K
, earth-surface gravitational acceleration, 9.80665m/s2
, temperature lapse rate, 0.0065K/m
, ideal (universal) gas constant, 8.31446J/(mol·K)
, molar mass of dry air, 0.0289652kg/mol

Temperature at altitude  meters above sea level is approximated by the following formula (only valid inside the troposphere, no more than ~18km above Earth's surface (and lower away from Equator)):

The pressure at altitude  is given by:

Density can then be calculated according to a molar form of the ideal gas law:

where:
, molar mass
, ideal gas constant
, absolute temperature
, absolute pressure

Note that the density close to the ground is 

It can be easily verified that the hydrostatic equation holds:

Exponential approximation
As the temperature varies with height inside the troposphere by less than 25%,  and one may approximate:

Thus:

Which is identical to the isothermal solution, except that Hn, the height scale of the exponential fall for density (as well as for number density n), is not equal to RT0/gM as one would expect for an isothermal atmosphere, but rather:

Which gives Hn = 10.4km.

Note that for different gasses, the value of Hn differs, according to the molar mass M: It is 10.9 for nitrogen, 9.2 for oxygen and 6.3 for carbon dioxide. The theoretical value for water vapor is 19.6, but due to vapor condensation the water vapor density dependence is highly variable and is not well approximated by this formula.

The pressure can be approximated by another exponent:

Which is identical to the isothermal solution, with the same height scale . Note that the hydrostatic equation no longer holds for the exponential approximation (unless L is neglected).

Hp is 8.4km, but for different gasses (measuring their partial pressure), it is again different and depends upon molar mass, giving 8.7 for nitrogen, 7.6 for oxygen and 5.6 for carbon dioxide.

Total content
Further note that since g, Earth's gravitational acceleration, is approximately constant with altitude in the atmosphere, the pressure at height h is proportional to the integral of the density in the column above h, and therefore to the mass in the atmosphere above height h. Therefore the mass fraction of the troposphere out of all the atmosphere is given using the approximated formula for p:

For nitrogen, it is 75%, while for oxygen this is 79%, and for carbon dioxide, 88%.

Tropopause
Higher than the troposphere, at the tropopause, the temperature is approximately constant with altitude (up to ~20km) and is 220K. Both the pressure and density obey this law, so, denoting the height of the border between the troposphere and the tropopause as U:

Composition

See also
Air
Atmospheric drag
Lighter than air
Density
Atmosphere of Earth
International Standard Atmosphere
U.S. Standard Atmosphere
NRLMSISE-00

Notes

References

External links
Conversions of density units ρ by Sengpielaudio
Air density and density altitude calculations and by Richard Shelquist
Air density calculations by Sengpielaudio (section under Speed of sound in humid air)
Air density calculator by Engineering design encyclopedia
Atmospheric pressure calculator by wolfdynamics
Air iTools - Air density calculator for mobile by JSyA

Atmospheric thermodynamics
A